Guillermo Rodriguez (born January 27, 1971), more commonly known as Guillermo, is a Mexican-American talk show personality who rose to fame while working as a parking lot security guard at the Hollywood Boulevard studios for American late night talk show Jimmy Kimmel Live! He continues in character and title as the show's security guard, but actually performs nightly as Jimmy Kimmel's sidekick.

Early life 
Rodriguez was born in Zacatecas, Mexico.

Career 
Rodriguez began working as a parking-lot security guard for Jimmy Kimmel Live! studio in 2003. At that time he also had a second full-time job as a hotel room server as well as working weekends at a third. He later moved from being a parking-lot security guard to appearing on-screen. Due to his shyness at the time Rodriguez initially turned down the offer to appear on the show in 2003 but was talked into it by one of the producers. His early appearances were with "Uncle Frank" Potenza in a series of bits called "Security Night Live". (Potenza had originally handled security for the show before his role was expanded to appear on screen.) Rodriguez soon moved to acting in skits on the show with his first role being Michael Jackson's Spanish cook. His broken English coupled with his affability and teddy bear-like quality earned him a high-profile supporting role as a personality on the show, in which he usually plays the Everyman. Guillermo took over main red-carpet interviewing duties in 2011 after Potenza died of natural causes. 

Rodriguez's signature segment is "Guillermo's Hollywood Roundup", in which, dressed in a cowboy outfit and pretending to twirl a special effect operated lasso, he makes a mockery of entertainment news shows featured widely on television. From outside the theater and standing next to his West Coast Customs-made "Guillermobile", he answers Kimmel's questions about the latest tabloid stories by taking a rack of magazines that the "Guillermobile" has been fitted with, and attempts to interpret the stories in an amusing and mis-translated way.

Another recurring joke is announcing that Rodriguez has a role in a current or recent major motion picture release and showing a clip of an at-first familiar trailer for the movie with Rodriguez edited in, his appearance often made-up to resemble a character in the movie. One sketch has Rodriguez impersonating Matt Damon's character of Jason Bourne in The Bourne Ultimatum by responding when asked to be named, "I am Yay-son... Bourne Identity." A physical fight between Rodriguez and Damon's actual character ensues. Rodriguez also starred alongside Kimmel in Boo!, a spoof of Saw. 

Rodriguez often sets out to interview famous celebrities. Some of his subjects do not know who he is, which the show uses for humorous interplay. Rodriguez regularly appears at the NBA Finals to interview players. At the 2015 Finals, he called out to LeBron James as James was practicing. James ignored Rodriguez, who had a meter counting how many times the name "LeBron" would be called before James acknowledged his presence. Guillermo will also interview and offer tequila to celebrities at the annual Academy Awards.

Rodriguez appeared as a special guest on the last episode of Univision telenovela Eva Luna on April 11, 2011. In 2017, he had a brief uncredited cameo in Marvel's Guardians of the Galaxy Vol. 2 as a policeman, which he revealed in a video on Jimmy Kimmel Live! in April 2017. In April 2017, Jimmy Kimmel named his son "Billy" after Guillermo.

Rodriguez was made an honorary citizen of Dildo through the Newfoundland tradition of "screeching in", on August 15, 2019, during Jimmy Kimmel Live!

Personal life 
Rodriguez is married. He and his wife have a son named Benji who was born on December 11, 2011.

He became a U.S. citizen in 2005.

Filmography

References

External links 

1971 births
Living people
Mexican television personalities
Mexican emigrants to the United States
Security guards
American television personalities of Mexican descent
People with acquired American citizenship